"Doing It for the Money" is a song by American indie pop band Foster the People. Initially released on April 27, 2017, on their YouTube channel as a part of their new EP (III), the song is featured as the second track on the band's third studio album, Sacred Hearts Club, and was released as the record's first single by Columbia Records.

Music video
The official video for "Doing It for the Money" was released August 11, 2017, and was directed by Daniel Henry and produced by Molly Oritz. The video utilizes Google's DeepDream Technology that "manipulates reality to create a sensory overload." On the topic of the video, Henry stated that "In researching more about the DeepDream world, I loved the idea of letting the collective unconscious of the internet play a part in the forming the music video. At any moment you can freeze frame and start to see a cryptic narrative that unfolds in infinite degrees. You might see a dog, or a dinosaur, or a dead president in these hallucinations, or it could just be projections of our inner turmoil."

Personnel
Foster the People
 Mark Foster – vocals, piano, bass synthesizer, tubular bells
 Isom Innis – drums, percussion, synthesizers

Additional personnel
 Manny Marroquin – mixing
 Ryan Tedder – backing vocals

Charts

Weekly charts

Year-end charts

References

2017 singles
2017 songs
Foster the People songs
Songs written by Ryan Tedder
Songs written by IN-Q
Songs written by Mark Foster (singer)